The 1967 Saint Louis Billikens men's soccer team represented Saint Louis University during the 1967 NCAA soccer season. The Billikens won their record-breaking tenth NCAA title this season. It was the sixteenth ever season the Billikens fielded a men's varsity soccer team. This was the most recent season the Billikens have won a national title.

Background 

The 1966 season, at the time, was the poorest season by the Saint Louis program. The Billikens failed to reach the semifinals for the first time in program history, being eliminated by eventual champions, San Francisco in the quarterfinals. Then-head coach, Bob Guelker described the result as the end of a dynasty for the university's dominance in college soccer. Guelker cited the increase of programs being fielded by university's making it difficult for teams to field top-heavy teams. Following the conclusion of the 1966 season, Guelker was hired away to coach the newly formed SIU Edwardsville Cougars men's soccer program.

Roster

Schedule 

|-
!colspan=6 style=""| Regular season
|-

|-
!colspan=6 style=""| NCAA Tournament
|-

|-

References

External links 

 Results

Saint Louis Billikens men's soccer seasons
Saint Louis
NCAA Division I Men's Soccer Tournament College Cup seasons
NCAA Division I Men's Soccer Tournament-winning seasons